Relative Success with Tabatha is a reality television show presented by Australian businesswoman, TV personality, author, and hairstylist Tabatha Coffey.  It premiered on the network Bravo in the United States. The first four episodes aired on Wednesday nights at 10 p.m. EST (9 p.m. CST), while the last four aired at the same time on Friday nights.  The premise of the show surrounds struggling family-owned small businesses.  Coffey visits each business for three weeks and improves aspects such as sales, inventory, and relationships between the relatives.

Coffey announced via Instagram that the March 23, 2018, episode of the series would be the last.

Episodes

References 

2018 American television series debuts
2018 American television series endings
2010s American reality television series
Bravo (American TV network) original programming